Tovonanahary Rabetsitonta (born April 3, 1949 in Ambovombe) is a current Malagasy politician. He is a member of the Senate of Madagascar for Analamanga, and is a member of the Groupe de Réflexion et d'Action pour le Développement de Madagascar party.

References
Official page on the Senate website 

1949 births
Living people
Members of the Senate (Madagascar)
People from Androy